The following is an alphabetical list of members of the United States House of Representatives from the state of Oregon.  For chronological tables of members of both houses of the United States Congress from the state (through the present day), see United States congressional delegations from Oregon.  The list of names is complete, but other data may be incomplete. It includes members who have represented both the state and the territory, both past and present.

Current members
Updated January 2023.
 : Suzanne Bonamici (D) (since 2012)
 : Cliff Bentz (R) (since 2021)
 : Earl Blumenauer (D) (since 1996)
 : Val Hoyle (D) (since 2023)
 : Lori Chavez-DeRemer (R) (since 2023)
 : Andrea Salinas (D) (since 2023)

List of representatives

See also

List of United States senators from Oregon
United States congressional delegations from Oregon
Oregon's congressional districts

References

 
Oregon
United States representatives